Bucket  is a four-part comedy drama series first shown on BBC Four in 2017.

It was created and written by Frog Stone and stars Miriam Margolyes as a septuagenarian intent on completing her bucket list with her less than willing adult daughter.

It premiered on BBC4 in April 2017.

References 

BBC television comedy